Khudgarz is a  1987 Indian Hindi-language action drama film, produced and directed by Rakesh Roshan under the Film Kraft banner. It features an ensemble cast of Jeetendra, Shatrughan Sinha, Govinda, Bhanupriya, Amrita Singh and Neelam Kothari with music composed by Rajesh Roshan. The film marks the directorial debut of actor Rakesh Roshan. The movie was a silver jubilee hit on release.

The movie was remade in Telugu in 1988 as Prana Snehithulu, in Tamil in 1992 as Annaamalai (which went on to be remade in Telugu in 1993 as Kondapalli Raja and in Kannada in 2003 as Gokarna) and in Odia in 2003 as Ae Jugara Krushna Sudama. The movie was based on Jeffrey Archer's 1979 novel Kane and Abel.

Plot
Khudgarz is the story of two childhood friends Amar Saxena, a young boy from a wealthy family, and Bihari Sinha, a boy of the same age from an impoverished background. Amar falls in love with Jaya, a florist and Bihari with Lata, a labourer and they marry the respective women.

Amar's father Brij Bhushan Saxena, who is a capitalist and a wealthy hotelier, wants to give a 5-star hotel to his son as a wedding present. The land for the construction of the hotel incidentally belongs to Bihari. Bihari had previously turned down several offers of selling his land because the house and land are his ancestral property.

When Amar requests Bihari, the latter agrees because they go a long way back. However, at the behest of Brij Bhushan, the agreement is drafted in a way that Amar and Brij Bhushan become the sole owners of the land. Bihari, in good faith puts his thumb impression on the agreement and loses his ancestral property.

The 5-star hotel gets ready, but on the opening day, some people condemn Bihari's place, which is on the same premises as the 5-star hotel, as a black spot which must be demolished. Amar, who is also convinced with the comments offers Bihari a new house and hotel in return. As Bihari is very sentimental about his hotel and place, he loses his temper and slaps Amar. This sours their relationship.

Sudhir, one of the most trusted workers of Brij Bhushan is a corrupt man. He takes the fullest advantage of the misunderstanding between the two friends and takes Brij Bhushan into his confidence, demolishes Bihari's place and hotel by a bulldozer and claims that Amar, in a state of inebriation had ordered its demolition.

Amar believes Sudhir and pleads for forgiveness from Bihari, offering to rebuild the structure for him. However Bihari does not relent and declares that he will himself build a chain of hotels and outshine Amar one day.

Bihar is given shelter by his most trusted friend Bhimji Nanji Premji Batliwala, a lawyer by profession. In the meantime, Amar learns that Sudhir is a traitor and throws him out of his house. Sudhir then joins hands with Bihari who he perceives to be on the way up.

Bihari is sanctioned a loan from a bank and builds his first hotel. He fixes his sister Lalita's marriage with Sudhir. Amar and his pregnant wife Jaya are also invited to the wedding and are on their way, but Sudhir manipulates so that Amar and Bihari do not come face to face.

In this trap, Jaya is injured, Amar takes her to the hospital where she gives birth to a son and dies. Gradually Bihari becomes more and more successful. His wife gives birth to a baby girl. Sudhir takes advantage of Bihari's illiteracy and gets blank papers signed by him, thus becoming Bihari's equal partner.

As luck would have it, the son and daughter of Amar and Bihari respectively fall in love with each other, despite knowing about the enmity of their respective families. Bihari's wife, Lata decides to pay a visit to Amar's house before things get out of hand. She then overhears a conversation and learns that the loans with which Bihari could grow and prosper were backed by Amar.

Lalita, Bihari's sister who has been suffering physical abuse at the hands of her husband Sudhir learns that he is making plans to kill her brother. She immediately approaches Amar for the safety of Bihari.

Lata informs Bihari about how Amar has been his benefactor. Bihari is crushed on learning about this and goes to Amar and reconciles. The two friends confront Sudhir and thrash him severely but stop short of killing him because he is married to Bihari's sister Lalita.

Cast
Jeetendra as Amar Saxena
Shatrughan Sinha as Bihari Bhuvaneshwar Prasad Sinha
Amrita Singh as Lata Sinha
Bhanupriya as Jaya Saxena
Govinda as Kumar Saxena
Neelam as Jyoti Sinha
Kader Khan as Advocate Bheemji Kanji Batliwala
Saeed Jaffrey as Brij Bhushan Saxena
Kiran Kumar as Sudhir
Sudhir Dalvi as Deshmukh
Praveen Kumar as Giant at Sports Club
Ghanshyam
Dinesh Hingoo
Rishi Kapoor as the Singing Tramp (guest appearance)
Abhi Bhattacharya as Minister (special appearance) who comes for inauguration of hotel
Satyen Kappu as Dayal
Mac Mohan
Sushma Seth as Seeta Sinha 
Master Javed Hyder as Young Bihari
Sujay khanta as Drunkard
Master Rinku as Young Amar Saxena

Box Office
The film was a big hit on Box office India and managed to collect ₹9.50 crore worldwide and declared Blockbuster. 'Aapke Aa Jane Se' song from this movie became one of the biggest blockbuster in Indian Cinema.

Soundtrack

The songs for this movie were penned by Indivar and music composed by Rajesh Roshan.

Remakes

References

External links

1980s Hindi-language films
Films directed by Rakesh Roshan
Films scored by Rajesh Roshan
Films set in hotels
Hindi films remade in other languages
1987 directorial debut films
Indian buddy films
Films about friendship